Guru Harkrishan Public School, Nanak Piao, India, was established in April 1982 by the Delhi Sikh Gurdwara Management Committee (DSGMC) with the aim of providing a public school education. The school is recognized by the Directorate of Education, Delhi and affiliated to the Central Board of Secondary Education for the AISSCE pattern examination.

Staff
 Chairman: Mr. Davinder Singh Kawatra
 Principal: Mrs.Amarjeet Kaur
 Vice Principal: Mrs. Harpreet Kaur

Buildings
The school is housed in a building with open space for playgrounds in a green plot. It has two main buildings comprising a Primary school and a Middle and Higher school. There is also a Gurudwara.

System of education
The School provides educational instruction to prepare students for all three streams at the Senior Secondary level viz Humanities, Commerce and Science.

See also
Education in India
List of schools in India
List of schools in Delhi affiliated with CBSE

References

External links
 Central Board of Secondary Education
 Govt. of NCT of Delhi

1982 establishments in Delhi
Educational institutions established in 1982
Schools in Delhi